Jidion Adams , (born December 12, 2000) better known online as JiDion, is an American YouTuber and former Twitch streamer known for his comedic vlogging content and prank videos.

Early Life 
JiDion Adams was born in Houston, Texas in 2000.

Career

YouTube
Adams first started his YouTube channel in 2018 with a video of him attempting to resell various items at his high school. His first viral video came around in early 2019 with the video “Giving Strangers The N-Word PASS”. In his comedic videos, Adams uses the pseudonym “DeMarcus Cousins III”, when being asked by strangers what his name is or when giving his name out to people. This fake name comes from NBA player DeMarcus Cousins. 

In December 2021, Adams attempted to get an autograph from the real DeMarcus Cousins, which prompted a stadium security guard to try and halt the interaction. Cousins told the security guard that he was "taking [his] job too serious!" and went on to sign Adams' jersey. In March 2022, he crashed a Harvard University "Life Sciences" lecture for a comedy video. Jidion also is known by NBA fans for pretending to get a haircut during a Houston Rockets game despite being bald.

During a 2022 video in which Adams got a haircut during a game between the Minnesota Timberwolves and Dallas Mavericks, the Mavericks owner, Mark Cuban, approached Jidon and spoke about how his relatives love watching his videos.

Adams’ YouTube channel currently has 6.5 million subscribers as of March 2023.

Twitch
In January 2022, Adams was permanently banned from Twitch for "extreme harassment". The harassment consisted of a Twitch "raid," where Adams instructed his viewers to comment something in the chat feature of another streamer's content. In Adams' case, he had his fanbase spam "L + ratio" in the chat of a Twitch streamer Pokimane.

Collaborations 
Adams has consistently collaborated with other famous YouTubers and Twitch streamers, primarily Adin Ross, who is largely based on Twitch. He has also collaborated with Kai Cenat, KSI and Pokimane.

Controversies
In the following years since his fame on YouTube started to grow, Jidon has caused controversies, with most of them being Adams doing an action at someone’s expense.

In October 2021, Adams uploaded a video where he kicked out of a Best Buy by an employee, due to Adams entering the store topless. Later on that day of recording, he brought a large group of other shirtless men inside the Best Buy in order to harass the employee who had kicked him out. During the same scenario, Adams repeatedly yelled “Free the Nipple!” into a megaphone.

In January 2022, he was accused of harassment by Twitch streamer Pokimane over misogynistic remarks about her appearance and relationship status.

In March 2022, he was seen getting a haircut during a game between the Minnesota Timberwolves and Dallas Mavericks.

In June 2022, he was ejected from the Tower of London for attempting to get a reaction from an on-duty Royal Guard.

In July 2022, Adams was accused by fellow YouTuber TommyInnit of harassing fans at TwitchCon(later proven to be false). That same month, he was banned from Wimbledon for his disruptive antics (which included repeatedly sounding an airhorn) during the quarterfinal match between Jannik Sinner and Novak Djokovic.

In September 2022, he was removed from the 2022 US Open men's finals after getting a haircut during the match.

In March 2023, He was arrested for trespassing on Galleria Property in Houston, TX, USA.

References

2000 births
21st-century American people
Living people
American YouTubers
Comedy YouTubers
People from Houston
Prank YouTubers
YouTubers from Texas
YouTube channels launched in 2018